Richard Ryther Steer Bowker (30 August 1815 – 3 April 1903) was an Australian mariner, physician, surgeon and politician.

Early life and education
Bowker was the son of Thomas Dawson and Elizabeth Steer and born at Campsall, Yorkshire, England. He was awarded diplomas in botany and materia medica in Paris in 1836 and an MD from the University of St Andrews in 1839. He kept a diary on the voyage which was edited and published by one of his descendants in 2016. The volume also records his service aboard the Sydney whaler Caroline (1841–42) as an ordinary seaman. He was a passenger on the Susannah from London to the Cape in 1845. From there he left to India where, in 1846, Indian contract labourers went aboard as passengers to Mauritius, with Bowker aboard as the ship's doctor. He sailed from Mauritius back to India, arriving at Madras in September 1846.

Career
In New South Wales, Bowker was appointed as a medical practitioner to the Loyal Union Lodge in Newcastle in 1842, resigning in 1844.  He was a surgeon on ships transporting coolies from India to Mauritius and Durban in 1846–1847.  He was reappointed to the Loyal Union Lodge in 1847.  From 1851 to 1853, he researched tropical diseases in the East Indies.  He briefly returned to Newcastle and then went to England gaining a Licentiate of the Royal College of Physicians and a Fellowship of the Royal College of Surgeons in 1854.  Bowker returned to Newcastle and was elected to the Legislative Assembly as member for North-Eastern Boroughs from January 1858 to 1859.  He married Lydia Frances Phillips in November 1858 and they eventually had issue three daughters and six sons.

From 1862 or 1863 until 1874, Bowker was simultaneously assistant surgeon for the Volunteer Artillery, health officer for Newcastle and  government medical officer.  He was particularly concerned to prevent the practice of placing cemeteries, such as the existing cemetery at  Christ Church, in the urban area, where they could pollute wells and swamps, which were still used for collecting water for household use.  Eventually, he persuaded the Council to build its new cemetery at Sandgate, well away from the urban area.  Apart from his public health interests, he also gained a reputation as an eye surgeon.

Bowker also owned ships, and valuable city properties and owned  of land at Waratah. He bred race horses at his estate, Bona Vista near Paterson.  He was the member for Newcastle from 1877–1888.  In 1888, he was appointed for life to the Legislative Council.  In 1873, he moved to Avoca House at Darling Point in Sydney, where he died.

References

 

Members of the New South Wales Legislative Assembly
English emigrants to colonial Australia
1815 births
Alumni of the University of St Andrews
1903 deaths
Fellows of the Royal College of Surgeons
19th-century Australian politicians
Australian people in whaling
19th-century Australian medical doctors
Maritime writers